Mitidja, (Arabic: , Berber: Mettijet ⵎⴻⵜⵙⵉⵛⵝ) is a plain stretching along the outskirts of Algiers in northern Algeria. Traditionally devoted largely to agriculture and serving as the breadbasket of Algiers, the area has in recent decades become increasingly urbanized with the expansion of Algiers.

Geography

The Mitidja plain is bounded on the east by the Boudouaou River, on the west by the Nador River, on the north by the hills of the Algiers Sahel, and on the south by the  range.

Its fertile soils enjoy a temperate Mediterranean climate with adequate rainfall, and are devoted largely to the cultivation of citrus fruits in east and grapes in the west.

From west to east, the plain traverses the wilayas (provinces) of Tipaza, Blida, Algiers, Boumerdès, and the north-eastern corner of Médéa. Four important urban centers are located along its edges: Algiers to the north, Blida to the south, Boumerdès to the east and Tipaza to the west, while Boufarik occupies the centre of the plain itself.

References

This article uses material translated from the French Wikipedia article.

Bibliography
 
 
 

Landforms of Algeria 
Plains of Africa